Travis Hamonic (born August 16, 1990) is a Canadian professional ice hockey defenceman for the  Ottawa Senators of the National Hockey League (NHL). He was drafted 53rd overall by the New York Islanders in the 2008 NHL Entry Draft.

Playing career

Junior
Hamonic started his major junior hockey career playing for the Moose Jaw Warriors of the Western Hockey League (WHL). He was selected by the New York Islanders in the second round, 53rd overall, of the 2008 NHL Entry Draft.

Prior to the 2009–10 WHL season Hamonic was named the co-captain of the Warriors alongside Jason Bast. In his final junior season, Hamonic was traded to the Brandon Wheat Kings on January 9, 2010.

Professional

New York Islanders
Following a Memorial Cup Championship Final loss to the Windsor Spitfires, Hamonic signed a three-year entry level contract with the New York Islanders on May 26, 2010.

On November 24, 2010, after spending 19 games in the American Hockey League (AHL) with the Islanders' top minor league affiliate, the Bridgeport Sound Tigers, Hamonic made his NHL debut, putting in a strong performance for New York, who ultimately lost in overtime against the Columbus Blue Jackets. He later scored his first NHL goal on February 1, 2011, against Ondřej Pavelec of the Atlanta Thrashers. Hamonic finished his rookie season with a total of five goals and 26 points in 62 games in a top-four role with the Islanders.

In his first two NHL seasons, Hamonic was the only Islanders player to finish both seasons with a positive plus-minus rating. In the midst of the 2012–13 NHL lockout, Hamonic returned to the Islanders' affiliate in Bridgeport and posted ten points in 21 games. Following the 2012–13 shortened season, in which he helped the Islanders return to the Stanley Cup playoffs, Hamonic became a restricted free agent; he was rewarded with a seven-year, $27 million contract extension by the Islanders.

Early in the 2015–16 NHL season, it was revealed that Hamonic had requested a trade specifically to Western Canada due to family reasons. Islanders general manager Garth Snow had known since before the season started, however was not able to find a deal that suited the Islanders' needs while accommodating Hamonic's request. After the playoffs, news broke that Hamonic had rescinded his trade request, expressing his desire to remain an Islander with the news that his family situation had "stabilized". On October 12, 2016, Hamonic was named as an alternate captain for the upcoming season. He was utilised as a defensive defenceman, often playing a shutdown role against the opposing teams' best forwards. On March 18, 2017, he broke a 34-game goalless drought when he scored in a 4–3 loss to the Columbus Blue Jackets.

Calgary Flames
On June 24, 2017, Hamonic was traded to the Calgary Flames along with a conditional fourth-round draft pick from the New York Islanders for a first-round draft pick (used on Noah Dobson) and two second-round draft picks in the 2018 NHL Entry Draft. With little cap space and a surplus of defencemen, the Islanders chose to move on from Hamonic to clear cap space. On April 23, 2018, Hamonic was nominated for the King Clancy Memorial Trophy as a player who best exemplifies leadership qualities on and off the ice and gives back to his community. During the 2017–18 season, he played alongside T. J. Brodie on the second defence pairing.

Following the Flames 2018–19 season opener loss to the Vancouver Canucks on October 3, 2018, Hamonic was placed on injured reserve to recover from a facial fracture following a fight with Erik Gudbranson. He was activated from injured reserve on October 25. On February 10, 2020 Hamonic was placed on injured reserve after suffering an another injury versus the Vancouver Canucks. On March 19, the NHL paused the 2019–20 season due to the COVID-19 pandemic. On July 10, 2020, Hamonic announced he opted-out of the 2020 Stanley Cup playoffs due to concerns surrounding the COVID-19 pandemic after the NHL made plans to finish the season. He finished the season with three goals and twelve points in 50 games.

Vancouver Canucks
As an unrestricted free agent from the Flames, Hamonic remained un-signed entering training camp for the delayed 2020–21 season. On January 4, 2021, he agreed to an invitation to attend the Vancouver Canucks training camp on a professional tryout basis. Nearing the conclusion of camp, Hamonic agreed to a one-year, $1.25 million contract with the Canucks on January 12, 2021. By this point in his career he was considered a great shot blocker, good on the penalty kill and a good person for the chemistry of the team. However, he was no longer a top-four defenceman, with the Canucks using him on the third pairing and to provide depth for the team. In 38 games that season, he registered three goals and ten points. In the off-season, Hamonic was re-signed by the Canucks to a two-year contract extension.

During the 2021–22 season, Hamonic was given leave of absence from the Canucks to deal with personal matters. He had failed to report to training camp. On October 10, he was placed on waivers, but was not claimed. Hamonic was assigned to the Canucks AHL affiliate, the Abbotsford Canucks on October 11. He was recalled by Vancouver on December 3, 2021.

Ottawa Senators 
On March 20, 2022, the Canucks traded Hamonic to the Ottawa Senators in exchange for a 2022 third-round pick.

Personal life
Hamonic, who is of Metis ancestry, grew up on Hamonic Farms in Manitoba, mostly farming with his dad and, at the age of five, discovered ice hockey. When he was ten years old, his father Gerald died due to a major heart attack. A year after that, Hamonic and his family moved to Winnipeg, where he continued thriving at hockey. He said it was his getaway from the thoughts of losing his father. He grew up in a religious family and during his time with the Islanders, he wore number 3 as a sign of the Holy Trinity (although Hamonic wore number 36 during his rookie season with the Islanders and later number 24 with the Calgary Flames and number 27 with the Vancouver Canucks). ESPN2 series E:60 did a feature on Hamonic titled "In the Name of the Father," an inspirational segment on Hamonic's story.

Community involvement
Hamonic and his wife, Stephanie, are active in many First Nations communities. During the 2016–17 off season, Hamonic worked with a television show called "Hit The Ice" to give assistance and exposure to young First Nations hockey prospects as they participated in a two-week NHL-format training camp for a chance to be seen by junior hockey scouts.
Hamonic and his wife also take part in The Northern Project initiative which provides Indigenous children from the Northwest Territories, Nunavut and Yukon the opportunity to visit Calgary. At the conclusion of the 2016–17 season, Hamonic was awarded the Foundation Player Award for his D-Partner Program, where he invited children to games who had lost parents, a program which he continued in Calgary.

Career statistics

Regular season and playoffs

International

Awards and honours

References

External links
 

1990 births
Living people
Abbotsford Canucks players
Brandon Wheat Kings players
Bridgeport Sound Tigers players
Calgary Flames players
Canadian expatriate ice hockey players in the United States
Canadian ice hockey defencemen
Canadian people of Croatian descent
Canadian people of Métis descent
Ice hockey people from Manitoba
Métis sportspeople
Moose Jaw Warriors players
New York Islanders draft picks
New York Islanders players
Ottawa Senators players
People from Eastman Region, Manitoba
Vancouver Canucks players